An election to Kerry County Council took place on 11 June 2004 as part of that year's Irish local elections. 27 councillors were elected from five electoral divisions by PR-STV voting for a five-year term of office.

Results by party

Results by Electoral Area

Dingle

Killarney

Killorglin

Listowel

Tralee

External links
 Voting data
 Official website
 Council Results
 Old Local Election Results

2004 Irish local elections
2004